Herdsmans Cove is a residential locality in the local government area (LGA) of Brighton in the Hobart LGA region of Tasmania. The 2016 census recorded a population of 1120 for the state suburb of Herdsmans Cove.

History 
Herdsmans Cove was gazetted as a locality in 2009. It was previously part of Gagebrook. It takes its name from the body of water to its south.

Geography
The Jordan River forms the western boundary. The waters of the Jordan River Estuary, also known as Herdsmans Cove, form most of the southern boundary. The East Derwent Highway forms the northern and eastern boundaries.

Road infrastructure 
Route B32 (East Derwent Highway) passes to the north and east. Access is provided by Gage Road.

References

Towns in Tasmania
Localities of Brighton Council (Tasmania)